Swapan Sen (born 4 January 1951) is an Indian former cricketer. He played first-class cricket for Bengal and Railways.

See also
 List of Bengal cricketers

References

External links
 

1951 births
Living people
Indian cricketers
Bengal cricketers
Railways cricketers
Cricketers from Kolkata